Ptiloedaspis tavaresiana is a species of tephritid or fruit flies in the genus Ptiloedaspis of the family Tephritidae.

Distribution
Spain.

References

Tephritinae
Insects described in 1920
Taxa named by Mario Bezzi
Diptera of Europe